Isfahan province, also transliterated as Esfahan, Espahan, Isfahan, or Isphahan, is one of the thirty-one provinces of Iran. It is located in the center of the country in Region 2. The provincial secretariat is located in the city of Isfahan.

The Judicial centers in Isfahan province include:

General references 
 

Isfahan Province
Isfahan